Adaptive Binary Optimization, (ABO), is a supposed lossless image compression algorithm by MatrixView Ltd. It uses a patented method to compress the high correlation found in digital content signals and additional compression with standard entropy encoding algorithms such as Huffman coding.

External links 
 : Repetition Coded Compression For Highly Correlated Image Data
 : Compressing image data

Image compression